People's Artist of the Russian Federation.

The honorary title "People's Artist of the Russian Federation" is given no earlier than five years after the honorary title "Honored Artist of Russia" or "Honored Art Worker of Russia" to an important artist who has created extraordinary works of painting, sculpture, graphic art, monumental, decorative, crafts, music, drama, film, or television; who has made an outstanding contribution to domestic art and culture; and who has received wide public recognition. This title in succession continues the Soviet tradition: a similar level of
recognition was conveyed by the USSR title of "People's Artist of the RSFSR."

External links 
 Russian Academy of Art

 
Russia
Honorary titles of Russia